João Ramalho is a municipality in the state of São Paulo in Brazil. The population is 4,551 (2020 est.) in an area of 416 km². The elevation is 551 m. It is named after the Portuguese explorer João Ramalho (1493–1580).

References

Municipalities in São Paulo (state)
1553 establishments in the Portuguese Empire